is a sushi restaurant in Ginza, Chūō, Tokyo, Japan. It is owned and operated by sushi master Jiro Ono. It was the first sushi restaurant in the world to receive three stars from the Michelin Guide, although it was removed from the Michelin Guide in November 2019 as it does not receive reservations from the general public, instead requiring reservations to be made through the concierge of a luxury hotel.

The restaurant itself only has ten counter seats. A two-star branch operated by his son Takashi is located at Roppongi Hills in Minato, Tokyo. The late French chef Joël Robuchon said that the restaurant was one of his favorites in the world, and that it taught him that sushi is an art.

Film
Sukiyabashi Jiro was the subject of David Gelb's 2011 acclaimed documentary Jiro Dreams of Sushi.

Fire
There was a fire at the restaurant on the morning of 24 June 2013. Firefighters said that a sushi chef had been using straw to smoke bonito, and that the straw most likely ignited after he returned it to the storeroom. The fire took about an hour to extinguish. There were no injuries.

Barack Obama visit

U.S. President Barack Obama dined at the restaurant with Japanese Prime Minister Shinzō Abe on 23 April 2014. There are conflicting reports as to whether Obama finished the sushi, though Prime Minister Abe said "Obama proclaimed it 'the best sushi I’ve ever had in my life.'"

See also
 List of Japanese restaurants
 List of Michelin 3-star restaurants
 List of sushi restaurants

References

External links
 

Ginza
Restaurants in Tokyo
Sushi restaurants in Japan